The Owen Sound North Stars are a Canadian Senior box lacrosse team.  The team played in the City of Owen Sound, Ontario, Canada and participated in the Major Series Lacrosse and the OLA Senior B Lacrosse League.  The North Stars were four-time Presidents Cup National Champions.

History
Founded in 1967, the Owen Sound North Stars became Owen Sound's cornerstone for senior lacrosse.  In 1951, the Owen Sound Crescents won the Mann Cup as National Senior Champions.  Although the experience was a great success, the price was too great as the team forced to fold after winning the Mann Cup and had to give up its top players.  The team came back a year later, but was not the same.  They eventually dropped down to Senior B for a couple seasons before ultimately folding.

For almost thirty years, the North Stars played hard and made their fans proud at both the Senior A and Senior B level.  Some seasons, the North Stars played the entire regular season in Senior A just to compete in the Senior B playoffs.  Their biggest rival seems to have been the Fergus Thistles, especially in the late years.

The North Stars won the Senior B league crown five times: 1979, 1980, 1989, 1990, and 1991.  The North Stars were also Presidents Cup National Champions four times: 1979, 1980, 1989, and 1991.  They were National bronze medallists in 1990.

The team folded in 1995 after a series of dismal years at the Major Senior level.  In 2000, the OLA Senior B Lacrosse League was rebuilt and the following season Owen Sound came back to Senior after six years of hibernation.  The current incarnation of Owen Sound senior lacrosse is the Owen Sound Woodsmen.

Season-by-Season results

See also
Major Series Lacrosse
OLA Senior B Lacrosse League
Presidents Cup (box lacrosse)

Ontario Lacrosse Association teams
Sport in Owen Sound